The 1970–71 season was the 68th season of competitive football in Belgium. Standard Club Liégeois won their 6th Division I title. RFC Brugeois reached the quarter-finals of the 1970–71 European Cup Winners' Cup. K Beerschot VAV won the Belgian Cup final against K Sint-Truidense VV (2-1 after extra time). The Belgium national football team started their UEFA Euro 1972 qualifying campaign as they were drawn in Group 5 with Portugal, Scotland and Denmark. They won all of their first 4 games and finished the season at the top of Group 5, 2 points ahead of Portugal with 2 matches to go.

Overview
At the end of the season, R Charleroi SC and ARA La Gantoise were relegated to the Division II, to be replaced by KSV Cercle Brugge and KV Mechelen from Division II.
The bottom 2 clubs in Division II (ASV Oostende KM and KSV Sottegem) were relegated to Division III, to be replaced by KSK Tongeren and K Boom FC from Division III.
The bottom club of each Division III league (VC Westerlo, RC Tirlemont, Kortrijk Sport and R Jet de Bruxelles) were relegated to the Promotion, to be replaced by R Herve FC, Wavre Sports, K Helzold FC and KSC Lokeren from Promotion.

National team

Key
 H = Home match
 A = Away match
 N = On neutral ground
 F = Friendly
 ECQ = European Championship qualification
 o.g. = own goal

European competitions
Standard Club Liégeois beat Rosenborg BK of Norway in the first round of the 1970–71 European Champion Clubs' Cup (won 2-0 away, 5-0 at home) but lost in the second round to Legia Warsaw of Poland (won 1-0 at home, lost 0-2 away).

RFC Brugeois eliminated Kickers Offenbach of West Germany in the first round of the 1970–71 European Cup Winners' Cup (lost 1-2 away, won 2-0 at home) and FC Zürich of Switzerland in the second round (won 2-0 at home, lost 1-2 away). In the quarter-finals, Bruges lost to future winner Chelsea FC after extra time (won 2-0 at home, lost 0-4 away).

The 3 Belgian clubs who entered the 1970–71 Inter-Cities Fairs Cup were ARA La Gantoise, RSC Anderlechtois  and KSK Beveren.
In the first round, RSC Anderlechtois beat NK Željezničar of Yugoslavia (won 4-3 away, 5-4 at home) and KSK Beveren beat Wiener Sportclub of Austria (won 2-0 away, 3-0 at home), but ARA La Gantoise lost to Hamburger SV of West Germany (lost 0-1 at home, 1-7 away).
In the second round, RSC Anderlechtois beat Akademisk Boldklub of Denmark (won 3-1 away, 4-0 at home), while KSK Beveren beat Valencia CF of Spain (won 1-0 away, drew 1-1 at home).
Both clubs exited at the third round, RSC Anderlechtois to Vitoria FC of Portugal (won 2-1 at home, lost 1-3 away after extra time) and KSK Beveren to Arsenal FC (lost 0-4 away, drew 0-0 at home).

Honours

Final league tables

Premier Division

 1970-71 Top scorer: West German Erwin Kostedde (Standard Club Liégeois) with 26 goals
 1970 Golden Shoe: Wilfried Van Moer (Standard Club Liégeois)

References